Billilingra is a locality in the Snowy Monaro Region, New South Wales, Australia. It lies on both sides of the Murrumbidgee River and on both sides of the Monaro Highway about 91 km south of Canberra and about 26 km north of Cooma.

Billilingra railway station opened on 18 October 1894, after the extension of the Bombala railway line through the site on 31 May 1889, and closed in May 1941.

References

Snowy Monaro Regional Council
Localities in New South Wales
Bombala railway line